Essence is an album by saxophonist Eric Kloss which was recorded in 1973 and released on the Muse label.

Reception

AllMusic reviewer Scott Yanow wrote: "A fine set that, along with most of Kloss' many Muse releases, is long overdue to be reissued."

Track listing 
All compositions by Eric Kloss.
 "Love Will Take You There" - 15:38   
 "Affinity" - 8:57   
 "Essence" - 16:36   
 "Descent" - 3:41

Personnel 
Eric Kloss - alto saxophone, tenor saxophone
Hannibal Marvin Peterson - trumpet 
Mickey Tucker - electric piano, piano 
Buster Williams - bass
Ron Krasinski - drums
Sonny Morgan - percussion (track 3)

References 

1975 albums
Eric Kloss albums
Muse Records albums
Albums produced by Don Schlitten